Călinescu is a Romanian surname. It may refer to:

Armand Călinescu (1893-1939), economist, politician and assassinated Prime Minister
George Călinescu (1899-1965), literary critic, writer and journalist
Matei Călinescu (1934-2009), literary critic
Paul Călinescu (1902-2000), film director

See also 
 Călin (given name)
 Călinești (disambiguation)

Romanian-language surnames
Patronymic surnames